Hannah Shaw (known as the Kitten Lady) is an animal advocate and an internet celebrity, known for being an educator on kittens.

Career
After leaving a consulting job to create training materials for animal shelters, Shaw began a career as an animal fosterer who specializes in kittens. She earned the moniker “Kitten Lady” from her efforts to educate the public in kitten rescue and foster care. 

Shaw works as a foster parent for orphaned kittens who would otherwise often be euthanized by animal shelters due to lack of resources and space to dedicate to neonatals. She informs others on how to foster for kittens, reduce stray cat populations, and contribute to animal welfare through her videos on social media, in-person workshops, personal interviews, and public speaking events. She has also published several books on kitten rescue or based on her fostering stories.

Shaw frequently posts on YouTube and Instagram caring for neonatal kittens and featuring instructional videos on kitten fostering. Once the kittens featured in her videos are old enough, they are adopted out, with Shaw saying "Goodbye is the goal". 

She runs her work through her nonprofit, the Orphan Kitten Club.

Personal life
Shaw lives in San Diego with her partner Andrew, who is a professional photographer. She and Andrew have four cats.

Shaw is the daughter of Tommy Shaw, the frontman and guitarist for the rock band Styx.

Publications

References

External links
 Kitten Lady
 
 

21st-century American women
Living people
American women writers
American YouTubers
Animal welfare workers
Instagram accounts
Year of birth missing (living people)